The Guilty is a 2000 American crime film directed by Anthony Waller and starring Bill Pullman, Devon Sawa, Gabrielle Anwar, Angela Featherstone and Joanne Whalley. The film is a remake of the 1992 UK TV two-part telemovie of the same name and identical plot starring Michael Kitchen, Sean Gallagher, Caroline Catz and Carol Starks.

Plot
Callum Crane (Bill Pullman) is in line for appointment to the federal bench, during the same week he rapes a new secretary at his office. It's also the same week Nathan Corrigan (Devon Sawa) (a young, callow ex-con) goes to the city to meet his biological father, the same Callum Crane. They meet and before Nathan can tell Crane who he is, Crane offers him money to kill the secretary, who has threatened to go to the police. Nathan takes an envelope of cash and the woman's photo, tells friends about it, and throws away the envelope. One of the friends, who needs money, retrieves the envelope and sets out to kill the woman. Can Nathan stop the crime?

Cast

References

External links
 
 

2000 films
2000 crime drama films
2000 crime thriller films
2000 independent films
American crime drama films
American crime thriller films
American independent films
American remakes of British films
American thriller drama films
Films about dysfunctional families
Films based on British novels
Films based on crime novels
Films directed by Anthony Waller
Films about rape
Films with screenplays by William Davies
Films about sexual harassment
2000s English-language films
2000s American films